Matthew John Kane IV (born April 8, 1962) is an American attorney and judge serving as Justice of the Oklahoma Supreme Court. Kane was appointed the state's highest court by Governor Kevin Stitt in 2019.  He was elected to a two year term as Chief Justice, commencing January 1, 2023.  He had previously served as the Vice Chief Justice for 2021-2022.

Education

Kane earned a Bachelor of Science from Oklahoma State University in 1984 and his Juris Doctor from the University of Oklahoma College of Law in 1987.

Career 

Kane began practicing law in 1987 at his father and grandfather's law firm, Kane, Kane & Kane Law Offices, P.C. in Pawhuska, Oklahoma. From 1987 to 1989, he served as an assistant district attorney and from 1999 to 2005, he served as an administrative law judge for the Oklahoma Department of Human Services Child Support Division.

State judicial service 

From 2005 to 2019, Kane served as district judge for the 10th Judicial District in Osage County.

On September 17, 2019, Governor Kevin Stitt announced the appointment of Kane to the Oklahoma Supreme Court to the seat vacated by Justice John F. Reif. He began a term as Vice Chief Justice on January 1, 2021.

Personal life 

Kane is the great-grandson of Matthew John Kane, a member of Oklahoma's first Supreme Court. He is married to Cyndi "Hyacinth" Kane, author, entrepreneur and friend of Ree Drummond.

References

External links
Governor Stitt appoints Judge Kane to Supreme Court of Oklahoma, Office of Governor Kevin Stitt

|-

1962 births
20th-century American lawyers
21st-century American judges
Chief Justices of the Oklahoma Supreme Court
District attorneys in Oklahoma
Justices of the Oklahoma Supreme Court
Living people
Oklahoma lawyers
Oklahoma Republicans
Oklahoma state court judges
Oklahoma State University alumni
People from Pawhuska, Oklahoma
University of Oklahoma College of Law alumni